Jacques Mory-Katmor (born 4 September 1938 in Cairo, Cairo Governorate, Egypt as Jacques Mory; died 6 September 2001 at the Tel Aviv Sourasky Medical Center in Tel Aviv, Tel Aviv District, Israel) was an Israeli bohemian/counterculture experimental filmmaker, painter, and, multimedia artist, of anarchical, underground, and, independent leanings.

Biography
He considered himself to be strongly influenced by Friedrich Nietzsche and the Marquis de Sade, as well as, by surrealism's artists such as André Masson and Hans Bellmer, Dada, the Situationist International's artists such as Guy Debord, the Beat Generation, Bernard Malamud, the band Faust, and, lettrism, and, eventually, changed his last name, on Avoth Yeshurun's suggestion, into a phonetic rendering of quatre mortes, French for "four deaths." His apartment, located at Dizengoff Street 40 in Tel Aviv, where, eventually, his only film was shot, was a cornerstone of city life, during that time. He married translator, model, and, editor , daughter of poet Avoth Yeshurun, while, working on his highly avant-garde 1969 film A Woman's Case, in which, she starred, a time, during which, he met, and, cast into his film, model and it girl Ann Tochmeyer, most famous, during that period, for, appearing on the covers of magazines such as HaOlam HaZeh, which, he married, after divorcing his wife, after he finished the shooting. The film was a commercial failure, and, hindered his ability to pursue his career as a filmmaker. Other works included creating television programs showcasing the works of artists such as Moshe Gershuni, Yosl Bergner (1971), Yaacov Agam (1973), and, Michail Grobman (1974). Some years later, around 1974, he left Israel for Cambodia, Canada, and, Thailand, with Tochmeyer leaving for San Francisco, and, finally, later, around 1975, for Amsterdam, together with Tochmeyer, returning in 1991. Reportedly, while abroad, they both became addicted to cocaine and heroin, while, squatting in abject poverty, forcing him to work in pornography, and, Tochmeyer, to work as a stripper, while, essentially, living in a sort of open relationship, together with artist . Officially, the cause of his death was listed as alcoholism-related.

Legacy

The Horse Hospital held a retrospective in his honor between 12 October and 9 November 2013.

References

External links
 
 
 
 
 
 

1938 births
20th-century Israeli painters
20th-century Mizrahi Jews
20th-century Sephardi Jews
20th-century Israeli male writers
2001 deaths
21st-century Israeli painters
21st-century Mizrahi Jews
21st-century Sephardi Jews
21st-century Israeli male writers
Alcohol-related deaths in Israel
École des Beaux-Arts alumni
Artists from Amsterdam
Egyptian emigrants to Israel
Film directors from Paris
Free love advocates
Israeli documentary film directors
Israeli expatriates in Canada
Israeli expatriates in France
Israeli expatriates in Switzerland
Israeli expatriates in the Netherlands
Israeli experimental filmmakers
Israeli people of Egyptian-Jewish descent
Israeli people of the Six-Day War
Israeli male screenwriters
Israeli soldiers
Israeli television directors
Jewish film people
Jewish Israeli artists
Jewish Israeli writers
Jewish painters
Jews and Judaism in Paris
Male painters
Multimedia artists
Artists from Cairo
Psychedelic drug advocates
Socialites
20th-century squatters
Burials at Yarkon Cemetery
20th-century Israeli screenwriters